The ruling family of Qatar, the House of Thani, is deeply involved in the field of art. For more than twenty years, some of its members have been accumulating numerous precious pieces of artwork.

The project Qatar National Vision 2030 promotes the creation of new schools, new universities and new museums. The Cultural development, characterized by new museums and exhibitions, is therefore closely linked to the political motive of building a “knowledge-based economy” in Qatar by 2030.

A journalist Barbara Pollack underlines the central role of the Al-Thani family while comparing Qatar's and Abu Dhabi’s cultural policies: "While Abu Dhabi is making a name for itself by building dramatic local satellites of the Louvres, the Guggenheim and the British Museum, Qatar's scheme of cultural nation building is much more homegrown, establishing its own museums rooted in the collections of its own royal family."

Collecting strategy of the Al-Thani family

Active members of the royal family 

Several members of the Al-Thani family initially led Qatar's interest and involvement into the field of arts and continue to embody and shape the cultural policy of the country. For William Lawrie, previously Head of International Modern Contemporary Arab and Iranian Art at Christie's, “Qatar’s royal family are very much like modern-day equivalents of the Medicis in 16th-century Florence”.

 Sheikh Saud’s older brother, Hassan bin Mohamed bin Ali Al Thani owns one of the most extensive collections of modern Arab art in the world, estimated at 6,300 pieces. While studying Art in Qatar University in the mid-1980s, he became deeply interested in 20th-century Arabic painting, and most particularly in Iraqi painters. Aware that art in general was "absent from Qatari life" at that time, he pursued the discovery of Arab artists. If Sheikh Hassan’s collection was primarily developed out of his personal interest in art and was not directed towards a specific audience, it now forms the core of the Mathaf museum.
 Saud bin Muhammed Al Thani, Qatari Emir Sheikh Hamad bin Khalifa al Thani's cousin and former president of Qatar's National Council for culture, Arts and Heritage possesses a large collection of traditional art pieces, such as manuscripts, carpets, scientific instruments and Mughai Jewellery. He largely contributes at establishing collections for five existing and planned museums: the Museum of Islamic Art, the National Library, the Natural History Museum, a photography museum and a traditional textiles and clothes museum.
 The emir's daughter Al-Mayassa bint Hamad bin Khalifa Al-Thani now embodies the involvement of Qatar's ruling family in art. As head of the Qatar Museums Authority (QMA), she is "arguably the most powerful woman in the art world today", according to the magazine Forbes, which ranked her among the 100 most powerful women of the world in 2012. In 2011, Art+Auction magazine ranked her number one for the art world’s most influential people. According to Benjamin Genocchio, editor in chief of Art+Auction, "Sheikha Al-Mayassa has the resources of an entire country at her disposal."

Qatari presence on the art market 

Qatar is depicted as a new "market maker" on the art market. In 2011, The Art Newspaper revealed Qatar is the world’s biggest art buyer.

Many commentators report a faultless strategy: Qatar bid systematically for famous pieces of art. It is a pragmatic but visionary approach that led the country to establish itself as a main player of the world art market. Qatar is advised by high-skilled international experts. Thierry Ehrmann, president and founder of Artprice ("the world leader in art market information") asserts that Qatar has implemented an “outstanding war machine” to make of Doha a “world capital of art”. According to him: "Qatar does not take any risk, takes the best and is willing to pay whatever it takes."

Large financial resources 

One of the most striking facts about Qatar's presence on the art market is the massive financial resources involved. The royal family and Qatar's cultural institution are upscale subscribers to the databank on art prices and indices Artprice Group.  A study conducted by Artprice and Organ Museum Research over the period 2000-2012 revealed that Qatar bid for art works with a margin of 40 to 45% above "market prices". Hence Forbes Magazine estimates that the annual budget for the sole Qatar Museum Authority is about $250 million.

The chief executive of the Fine Art Fund Group, an art investment management and consulting firm based in London, estimates that Qatari buyers make up to 25 percent of the Middle East's $11 billion art market.

Al-Thani's art collection: overview 

For more than twenty years, the Al-Thani family had been buying a large collection of art works, from traditional Islamic artifacts to famous pieces of modern and contemporary art

Antiques 

Partly as a consequence of Sheikh Saud's significant interest into traditional art, the Al-Thani family possesses a wide collection of Islamic, Roman and Egyptian art and antiques, alongside a wide range of artifacts from all over the world. The collection includes:
 Artifacts (glass, carpets, astrolables)
 Qurans, manuscripts
 Rare books, including a complete set of John James Audubon's Birds of America
 Persian miniatures
 Fine jewellery
 18th-century French furniture
 Natural history prints and specimens

Western art 

Estimates show that the Al-Thani has spent at least $1 billion on Western painting and sculpture over the last twenty years. Sheikha Al-Mayassa is known for being particularly interested in the work of Western contemporary art's big names, such as Jeff Koons, Takashi Murakami, Damien Hirst, Richard Serra, Louise Bourgeois and Mark Rothko .

The royal family of Qatar currently owns one painting of the series The Card Players by the French artist Paul Cézanne.

As a prominent buyer on the art market, the Al-Thani family has significantly expanded its modern art collection. The family owns notably:
 Mark Rothko's painting White Center (Yellow, Pink and Lavender on Rose)
 Francis Bacon's Study from Innocent X
 Damien Hirst's Lullaby Spring

Middle-Eastern and North African art 
In addition to building collections of works by international artists, the Al-Thani family is committed to developing Arab contemporary art and supporting regional artists. The credit goes in the first place to Sheikh Hassan bin Mohamed bin Ali Al Thani, who began buying Arab art in the mid-1980s while very little attention had been carried out on the region's artistic movements. In 1986, he started collaborating with the artist and art educator Yousef Ahmad.

Hassan Al-Thani supported Iraqi artists after the Iraqi invasion of Kuwait and the first Gulf War. He owns an extensive collection of art pieces produced by two of the most well-known Iraqi artists Ismail Fatah Al Turk and Shakir Hassan Al Said. His collection of Iraqi art is known as the biggest in the world. According to Antonia Carver, Fair Director of Art Dubai, "News about Cézanne and Damien Hirst hits headlines, but it’s perhaps these more localized forms of patronage — such as Sheik Hassan’s care for Iraqi artists over several decades — that are particularly meaningful within the region."

The exhibition for the opening of Mathaf in December 2010 featured art pieces of several Arab artists, such as:
 French artists of Algerian origin Kader Attia and Zineb Sedira
 Iraqi Adel Abidin
 Palestinian Khalil Rabah
 Moroccans Farid Belkahia and Mounir Fatmi
 Egyptians Ahmed Nouar and Ghada Amer
 Lebanese Walid Raad

Photography 

Saud Al-Thani bought quite important photographs collections, notably 136 vintage photographs including pieces by Alfred Stieglitz and Man Ray in 2000 and a black and white photograph by Joseph-Philibert Girault de Prangey in 2003 for £565,250, which settled a new world record

Al-Thani's collection displayed: museums and exhibitions 

With such wide art collections, Qatar proceeds for several years to build museums and to sponsor exhibition to host them. It makes part of Qatar's strategy to be acknowledged as a main worldwide actor.

Museums

Qatar Museums Authority 

One significant innovation has been the establishment of the Qatar Museums Authority in 2005, a government body that cooperates with the Culture Ministry but which is, according to The Economist, "above all a family affair". Interviewed by the English newspaper, Sheikha Al-Mayassa asserts, "The QMA is very much my father’s baby. He wanted to create something to connect with the community, to create a cultural dialogue within society (…) we want the QMA to be a 'cultural instigator', a catalyst of arts projects worldwide."

Museum of Islamic Art 

The Museum of Islamic Art in Doha opened in 2008. It was designed by I.M. Pei, the Chinese-American architect that notably built the glass pyramid for the Louvre in Paris. It is considered to be one of the world’s great museums.

 MIA Park
The inauguration of the new public space was a key event of the year 2011. Developed by QMA and located on the grounds of the MIA, the park notably includes Richard Serra '7'. The 80-foot-high sculpture is the American artist's first public work in the Middle East. The Emir Sheikh Hamad bin Khalifa Al Thani was present during the inaugural ceremony, along with 700 guests. During her speech, Sheikha Al Mayassa asserted that the new park will invite the citizens of Doha to interact with contemporary and other creative arts. At the same time, the new park will complement and enhance the Museum of Islamic Art designed by my father."

Mathaf 

The growing interest for Arab Modern art is symbolized by the opening of Mathaf in December 2010 (Mathaf is the Arabic word for museum). Based on a collection of paintings and other art pieces from the 1840s, this embryo project aims to give modern art a wider audience in the Arab world. “We are making Qatar the place to see, explore and discuss the creations of Arab artists of the modern era and of our own time” says Sheikha al-Mayassa al-Thani

Its originator and most fervent defender, Sheikh Hassan bin Mohamed bin Ali Al Thani explains how the museum was aimed at filling a void in modern Arab art in Qatar: "Since the collection had increased its representation of periods and styles, I began planning to make it part of a specific project. At the time, I did not know of any museum of Arab art from the 19th century to today. As a painter and photographer — simply put, as an artist — I was passionate about modern and contemporary art and artistic movements in the Arab world. But only in Egypt could you find quality museums devoted to the history of Arab art and its different forms of expression. Otherwise there was almost nothing anywhere. So instead of continuing in the darkness, I decided to light a light".

National Museum of Qatar 

One of the biggest projects of Qatar is the opening of the National Museum that was opened in 2019. As for the MIA, Qatar succeeded in involving the well-known French architect Jean Nouvel on the project.

Sheikh Faisal Bin Qassim Museum
The Sheikh Faisal Bin Qassim Al Thani Museum was opened in 1998 and currently showcases over 15,000 artifacts that were collected by Faisal Bin Qassim Al Thani over a span of several years.

Art events 

Besides largely contributing to the construction of new museums, Al-Thani Family is involved in a wide range of art events.

 Murakami Ego and Qatar Japan 2012

In 2010, Qatar funded the exhibition of the Japanese artist Takashi Murakami, known as Murakami-Ego and shown at the Palace of Versailles in 2010. The exhibition was later shown in Doha in 2012. The Museum of Islamic Art was initially proposed, yet the Japanese artist found the space not large enough. A temporary hall was built instead, known as the Al Riwaq exhibition space, located near the MIA. It is the first exhibition displayed by Murakami in the Middle East.  Murakami-Ego was the launching event of Qatar-Japan 2012, an initiative aimed at reinforcing the diplomatic relations between the two countries through a series of cultural and sporting activities.

 Louise Bourgeois and Maman

From January to June 2012, Qatar Museums Authority organized the exhibition "Conscious and Unconscious", gathering about 30 works of art created by Louise Bourgeois between 1947 and 2009. The centrepiece of the exhibition is the famous 9-meter-high bronze spider sculpture Maman. QMA's chairperson, Sheikha Al-Mayassa, commented on the importance of the sculpture to Qatar: "Louise Bourgeois' Maman is a true icon of 20th Century art, an artwork that has captured the attention of millions around the world.  We are proud to present this magnificent sculpture at the Qatar National Convention Centre. Through displaying various forms of art in public spaces we aim to inspire local talent and to establish an organic connection between art and the local community.". The sculpture will stay permanently in Doha.

 Photography Contest: Al-Thani award for Photography

The Photography Competition, created in 2001, is amply sponsored by Saud bin Muhammed Al Thani. It has greatly expanded over the last 12 years, opened to the Gulf Region in 2003, to the Arab World in 2005. It became an international competition in 2006.

Controversies 

The active participation of the ruling family in the art market has invited some controversy and criticism concerning transaction opacity and the public/private nature of financial resources involved.

Opacity and secrecy 

Al Thani family formally refuses to confirm or deny the rumours circulating over the art acquisitions of these past years. It is therefore particularly hard to assess whether these acquisitions are purely private or done on behalf of the State.

Saud al Thani under house arrest in 2005 

In 2005, Saud Bin Mohammed Al-Thani was sued for not fulfilling a payment of $20 million for ancient Greek coins. This event rekindled the concerns about his huge spending on art artifacts, estimated at $2.5 billion over eight years.

See also
 Hassan bin Mohamed bin Ali Al Thani
 Al-Mayassa bint Hamad bin Khalifa Al-Thani
 Mathaf
 Qatar Museums Authority

Sources 
 "Art and the Middle East: Qatar's culture Queen", The Economist, 31 March 2012
 Georgina Adam and Charlotte Burns, "Qatar revealed as the world’s biggest contemporary art buyer", The Art Newspaper, 7 July 2011
 Robert Kluijver, "Introduction to the Gulf Art World"
 Christian Chesnot, Georges Malbrunot, Qatar: les clés du coffre-fort, Michel Lafont, March 2013

References 

Arts in Qatar
Museums in Qatar
Qatari art collectors